Kurt Ehrmann (7 June 1922 – 2 August 2013) was a German international footballer. Born in Karlsruhe, Ehrmann played as a forward for Karlsruher FV, VfB Mühlburg and 1. FC Pforzheim. He also competed in the 1952 Summer Olympics.

References

External links

1922 births
2013 deaths
German footballers
Germany international footballers
Association football forwards
Olympic footballers of Germany
Footballers at the 1952 Summer Olympics
Footballers from Karlsruhe
Karlsruher FV players
1. FC Pforzheim players
20th-century German people